The Super Dvora Mark II-class patrol boats is a high-speed class of patrol boats meant for a variety of naval missions from typical off-shore coastal patrol mission profiles to high-speed, high-maneuver littoral warfare. Built by Israel Aerospace Industries for the Israeli Sea Corps, the Super Dvora Mark II is the successor to the s. The Super Dvora Mark IIs have been employed by the Sri Lanka Navy to counter LTTE operations at sea.

Design and construction 
 in length, the Super Dvora II has a marine aluminum alloy planing hull in order to maintaining high standards of sea-keeping, maneuverability and static/dynamic intact/damaged stability in adverse environments.

Armament 
Originally the main armament of the Super Dvora Mark II design was the Oerlikon 20 mm cannon which were manually operated. At present all Super Dvora Mark II types have been modified to allow for the installation of Typhoon 25-30 mm stabilized cannon which can be slaved to state-of the art mast-mounted, day/night, long-range electro-optic systems. In addition to its main armament, Super Dvora Mark IIs carry heavy or light machine guns, depending on the operational requirements.

Sri Lankan Navy Super Dvora Mark IIs carry additional weapon systems such as Automatic Grenade Launchers, GPMGs & HMGs

Operators 

Eritrean Navy (6) 

 Indian Navy (6 with 1 Retired)

 Israeli Navy (2 with 2 retired)

Slovenian Navy (1)

 Sri Lanka Navy (4 with 1 sunk)

References

External links 
www.israeli-weapons.com 
Super Dvora II bharat-rakshak.com

Patrol boat classes
Naval ships of Israel
Ships of the Sri Lanka Navy
Naval ships of India